Petar Bojović  (16 July 1858 – 19 January 1945) was a Serbian military commander who fought in the Serbo-Turkish War, the Serbo-Bulgarian War, the First Balkan War, the Second Balkan War, World War I and World War II. Following the breakthrough on the Thessaloniki Front he was promoted to fourth Field Marshal.

Life

Early life
Bojović was born on 16 July 1858 in Miševići, Nova Varoš. He had distant ancestry from the Vasojevići.

He fought in Serbian-Ottoman Wars from 1876 to 1878 as a cadet of the Artillery school, as well as in wars that Serbia waged at the beginning of the 20th century. He was Chief of the General Staff for the first time from 1905 to 1908.

Balkan Wars
In the Balkan Wars, he was the Chief of Staff of the 1st Army, which scored huge success in battles of Kumanovo, Bitola (First Balkan War) and Bregalnica (Second Balkan War). Given that the commander was the militarily infinitely less experienced crown prince Alexander who had to rely heavily on his chief of staff - the appointment made him effectively the commander of the army. He took part in peace negotiations with Turkey, held in London in 1913, as a military expert in the Serbian Government delegation.

World War I
At the start of World War I, he was given command of the 1st Army. His army suffered huge losses at the Battle of Drina in 1914, but managed to stop the Austro-Hungarian offensive. Bojović was wounded in the battle, and was replaced at the army general position by Živojin Mišić. In January 1916, he was appointed Chief of General Staff for a second time in place of the ailing vojvoda Radomir Putnik, who was carried by his soldiers to the city of Skadar. He held that position until June 1918, when he resigned because of disputes with the allied generals on the issue of widening the Thessaloniki Front. He returned to his position Commander of the 1st Army, which broke the enemy lines and advanced deep into the occupied territory.

Inter-war years and World War II
In 1921, he was appointed Chief of the General Staff of the Yugoslav Army, and in 1922 he withdrew from active service.

At the very beginning of World War II, Petar Bojovic was appointed Deputy Commander-in-Chief of the Yugoslavian Armed Forces by the young King Petar II Karađorđević. However, because of his old age, he did not participate in the events that followed.

Death
One of the most famous historical myths in Serbia is that Petar Bojović was tortured by new communist authorities following liberation of Belgrade and that he died from consequences of that torture. Bojović was indeed questioned by new authorities for three days, however according Kosta Rakić, close family friend of Bojović, elderly commander wasn't harmed in any way during interrogation. Two months passed between the questioning and Bojović's death. Later two members of Yugoslav Partisans, including an officer, broke into vojvoda's home, insulted him and stole his sabre. Bojović's son Dobrica than hit officer down the stairs, and than both Partisans ran away. Vojvoda was disturbed by the incident, but wasn't physically harmed during it. Bojović died during on January 19 1945 from pneumonia.

Bojović wasn't buried with military and state honors, but privately. This was expected as Bojović was a commander of a army that capitulated in 1941 and state that didn't exist anymore. Two members of OZNA were present at a funeral.

Awards and decorations

See also
 Radomir Putnik
 Živojin Mišić
 Stepa Stepanović
 Božidar Janković
 Ilija Gojković
 Pavle Jurišić Šturm
 Ivan S. Pavlović

References

Literature
 
 

1858 births
1945 deaths
People from Nova Varoš
Vasojevići
Serbian soldiers
Serbian military personnel of World War I
Serbian military personnel of the Balkan Wars
Field marshals
Honorary Knights Commander of the Order of St Michael and St George
Recipients of the Order of the Yugoslav Crown
Royal Serbian Army soldiers
Burials at Belgrade New Cemetery
Recipients of the Order of the Cross of Takovo